Panniyankara has its origin in the 18th century situated in Calicut district in Kerala, India. The main features are police station, Government Homeo Dispensary, Sathram Bus Stop and Southern Railway. Government Homeo Dispensary was previously known as Princess of Wales Dispensary which was built in 1902 during British rule in India. Panniyankara is surrounded with the places such as Kallai, Thiruvannur,  Kannanchery, Vattakkinar, Payyanakkal etc.

Panniyankara is proposed to have a Monorail station once the Second phase of Kozhikode Monorail project complete. India's former defence minister and eminent diplomat V.K.Krishna Menon was born here. Mohammad Sabir Baburaj M. S. Baburaj a well known Malayalam music composer is hailing from this place. Currently Panniyankara area is represented by Nirmala, an Independent Candidate from Kozhikode Corporation.

Major Landmarks
 Parvathypuram Colony
 Princess of Wales Dispensary
 Panniyankara Police Station
 Madrassathul Alaviyya
 Government U.P.School, Kallai
 Panniyankara Library
 Odakkal Bhagavathy Temple
 Kizhakkemurigath sree bhagavathi temple

References

Suburbs of Kozhikode
Kozhikode downtown